Stormy Down is a Site of Special Scientific Interest flanking the M4 motorway near Pyle in Bridgend County Borough, South Wales. During World War Two, an aerodrome has been there.

See also
 List of Sites of Special Scientific Interest in Mid & South Glamorgan
 RAF Stormy Down

References 

Sites of Special Scientific Interest in Bridgend County Borough